Arthur Fisher (14 December 1882 – 9 July 1968) was an Australian cricketer. He played three first-class matches for New South Wales between 1903/04 and 1907/08.

See also
 List of New South Wales representative cricketers

References

External links
 

1882 births
1968 deaths
Australian cricketers
New South Wales cricketers
Cricketers from Sydney